(The) Mystic(al) Marriage of Saint/St. Catherine may refer to any of a large number of paintings of the Mystical marriage of Saint Catherine, a few of which are:

 Mystic Marriage of Saint Catherine (Spinello Aretino), c. 1390 painting in the nearby Cialli-Seringi Chapel in Santa Trinita in Florence, Italy
 Mystical Marriage of Saint Catherine (Michelino da Besozzo), c.1420 painting in the Pinacoteca Nazionale of Siena, Italy
 Mystic Marriage of Saint Catherine (Correggio), mid-1520s painting in the Louvre, Paris, France
 Mystic Marriage of Saint Catherine (Correggio, Detroit), c. 1512 painting in the Detroit Institute of Arts, Detroit, Michigan
 Mystic Marriage of Saint Catherine (Correggio, Naples), c. 1520 painting in the National Museum of Capodimonte in Naples, Italy
 Mystic Marriage of Saint Catherine (Correggio, Washington), c. 1510–1511 painting in the National Gallery of Art in Washington D.C.
 Marriage of St. Catherine (Filippino Lippi), 1503 painting in the Basilica di San Domenico, Bologna, Italy
 Mystic Marriage of Saint Catherine (Lotto, Munich), 1506–1508 painting in the Alte Pinakothek in Munich, Germany
 Mystic Marriage of St. Catherine (Memling), c. 1480 painting in the Metropolitan Museum of Art, New York
 Mystic Marriage of Saint Catherine (Moretto), c. 1543 painting in the church of San Clemente in Brescia, Italy
 Mystic Marriage of Saint Catherine (Moroni), 1567–1570 painting in the church of San Bartolomeo, parish church of Almenno San Bartolomeo, Italy
 Mystical Marriage of Saint Catherine (Parmigianino), known as the Bardi Altarpiece, c.1521 painting in the church of Santa Maria at Bardi, Emilia-Romagna, Italy
 Mystic Marriage of Saint Catherine (Parmigianino, Louvre), c. 1529 painting in the Louvre, Paris, France
 Mystic Marriage of Saint Catherine (Parmigianino, National Gallery), c. 1529 painting in the National Gallery, London, UK
 Mystic Marriage of Saint Catherine (Parmigianino, National Gallery of Parma), c. 1524 painting in the Galleria nazionale di Parma, Parma, Italy
 Mystic Marriage of Saint Catherine (Procaccini), c. 1616–1620 painting in the Pinacoteca di Brera in Milan, Italy
 Mystic Marriage of Saint Catherine (Andrea del Sarto), c. 1512–1513 painting in the Gemäldegalerie in Dresden, Germany
 Mystic Marriage of Saint Catherine (Veronese, circa 1547-1550), c. 1547–1550 painting in the Yale University Art Gallery, New Haven, Connecticut
 Mystic Marriage of Saint Catherine (Veronese, 1575), c. 1575 painting in the Gallerie dell'Accademia, Venice, Italy

See also
 Mystical Marriage of St Catherine and Saints (Lotto)
 Mystical Marriage of St Catherine of Alexandria with Niccoló Bonghi